Wanaku (Aymara and Quechua for guanaco, also spelled Guanaco, Huanaco, Huanacu) may refer to:

 Wanaku (Chuquisaca), a mountain in the Chuquisaca Department, Bolivia
 Wanaku (Peru), a mountain in the Ancash Region, Peru
 Wanaku (Potosí), a mountain in the Potosí Department, Bolivia